Yoshikawa Station is the name of three train stations in Japan:

 Yoshikawa Station (Ishikawa) (良川駅)
 Yoshikawa Station (Saitama) (吉川駅)
 Yoshikawa Station (Kochi) (よしかわ駅)